Cubelles power station (Central térmica de Cubellas / Central térmica de Foix) - thermoelectric plant located in Cubelles, in Province of Barcelona, Spain. In June 2015 the stop of operations was announced. In 2019 was completely demolished.

See also 
 List of power stations in Spain

References 

Power stations in Catalonia
Natural gas-fired power stations in Spain